Samantha Foggo (born 14 September 1974) is a British swimmer. She competed in two events at the 1992 Summer Olympics.

References

External links
 

1974 births
Living people
British female swimmers
Olympic swimmers of Great Britain
Swimmers at the 1992 Summer Olympics
Sportspeople from Newcastle upon Tyne
20th-century British women